Ramas is a town and former Makwana Koli princely state in Mahi Kantha.

The village is in Bayad Taluka, in Aravalli district of Gujarat state, western India.

History 
Ramas was a Sixth Class princely state and taluka, comprising eight more villages, covering six square miles. It existed during the British Raj under the colonial Mahi Kantha Agency.

Places of interest 
There is a step-well said to have been built five hundred years ago by the wife of a Nawa of Kapadvanj.

References

External links and sources 
 Imperial Gazetteer on DSAL - Mahi Kantha

Princely states of Gujarat
Muslim princely states of India
Villages in Aravalli district
Koli princely states